Judith Littleton is a New Zealand anthropology academic, and as of 2018 is a full professor at the University of Auckland.

Academic career

After a 2011 PhD titled  'A delicious torment : an analysis of dental pathology on historic Bahrain'  at The Australian National University, Littleton moved to the University of Auckland, rising to full professor.

Selected works 
 Littleton, Judith, and Bruno Frohlich. "Fish‐eaters and farmers: dental pathology in the Arabian Gulf." American Journal of Physical Anthropology 92, no. 4 (1993): 427–447.
 Littleton, Judith, and Harry Allen. "Hunter-gatherer burials and the creation of persistent places in southeastern Australia." Journal of Anthropological Archaeology 26, no. 2 (2007): 283–298.
 Wilbur, Alicia K., A. W. Farnbach, K. J. Knudson, Jane E. Buikstra, Bernardo Arriaza, Deborah Blom, Piers D. Mitchell et al. "Diet, tuberculosis, and the paleopathological record." Current Anthropology 49, no. 6 (2008): 963–991.
 Littleton, Judith. "Fifty years of chimpanzee demography at Taronga Park Zoo." American Journal of Primatology: Official Journal of the American Society of Primatologists 67, no. 3 (2005): 281–298.
 Littleton, Judith, Julie Park, Craig Thornley, Anneka Anderson, and Jody Lawrence. "Migrants and tuberculosis: analysing epidemiological data with ethnography." Australian and New Zealand journal of public health 32, no. 2 (2008): 142–149.

References

Living people
New Zealand women academics
Year of birth missing (living people)
New Zealand anthropologists
New Zealand women anthropologists
Australian National University alumni
Academic staff of the University of Auckland
21st-century New Zealand women writers